Sir Ross Hutchinson, DFC (10 September 1914 – 19 December 1999) was an Australian rules footballer, coach and politician. He played for and coached East Fremantle, West Perth and South Fremantle in the West Australian National Football League (WANFL) before spending 27 years as a member of the Western Australian Legislative Assembly.

Early life
Hutchinson was born in Worsley in 1914. He was educated at Deanmill before attending Wesley College in Perth from the age of 14.

Football career
Hutchinson was used in a variety of positions during his football career including centreman, half back and half forward. In his first two seasons he won the Lynn Medal as East Fremantle's fairest and best player. He captain-coached the club to a premiership in 1937, as a half back flanker. The following two seasons ended in grand final losses, both to Claremont. In 1939 he was captain-coach of the Western Australian interstate football team which took on Victoria.

Hutchinson sought a clearance to West Perth for the 1940 season but, because it wasn't granted by East Fremantle, he had to sit out the entire season. He was able to coach West Perth in 1941, and not only steered them to that year's premiership but also to the 1942 'under-age' premiership.

When he returned to coaching in 1946, following his war service, he had received the clearance he sought, which meant that he was able to take the field for West Perth and steer the club to a losing grand final.

He made the move to South Fremantle in 1947 and was captain-coach of their premiership team that year, kicking two goals in the Grand Final from the half forward flank. In 1948 he again coached the club to a premiership, but he had retired as a player and it was only in an off-field capacity. Hutchinson continued as non playing coach in 1949, his final season. South Fremantle finished in third position, the only time he failed to coach a WANFL club into the grand final.

Hutchinson is one of only two people to have coached three separate WA(N)FL clubs to premierships; John Todd was the other. He steered each of the clubs to premierships in his very first year. He coached 176 WANFL games in total, 72.4% of which were won.

War service
During the Second World War he fought with the Royal Australian Air Force in Europe as a pilot. Hutchinson was awarded a Distinguished Flying Cross (DFC) in 1944 after a bombing run on an oil refinery in Sterkrade was interrupted when his aircraft was hit by anti-aircraft fire. He was able to return the aircraft to Britain, while managing to take valuable photographs of the intended target.

Political career
In 1950 Hutchinson successfully ran for the newly created seat of Cottesloe in the Western Australian Legislative Assembly, representing the Liberal and Country League (later the Liberal Party), and held the seat until his retirement in 1977. After David Brand led the Liberals to victory in 1959, Hutchinson was named Chief Secretary, Minister for Health and Minister for Fisheries, posts he held in both the Brand-Watts and Brand-Nalder Ministries. From May 1974 to February 1977, Hutchinson was speaker of the Western Australian Legislative Assembly.

Honours
He was knighted for services to the state of Western Australia when he retired from politics.

His contribution to Australian rules football was also honoured, in 2004, when he was inducted into the West Australian Football Hall of Fame.

References

External links

1914 births
1999 deaths
East Fremantle Football Club players
East Fremantle Football Club coaches
South Fremantle Football Club players
South Fremantle Football Club coaches
West Perth Football Club players
West Perth Football Club coaches
Australian rules footballers from Western Australia
West Australian Football Hall of Fame inductees
Members of the Western Australian Legislative Assembly
Speakers of the Western Australian Legislative Assembly
Liberal Party of Australia members of the Parliament of Western Australia
Australian sportsperson-politicians
People educated at Wesley College, Perth
Australian Knights Bachelor
20th-century Australian politicians
Royal Australian Air Force personnel of World War II
Royal Australian Air Force officers
Australian World War II pilots